Vadim Khersontsev (born 8 July 1974 in Kursk) is a retired male hammer thrower from Russia, whose personal best throw is 81.26 metres, achieved in July 2001 in Bryansk.

International competitions

References

sports-reference

1974 births
Living people
Sportspeople from Kursk Oblast
Russian male hammer throwers
Olympic male hammer throwers
Olympic athletes of Russia
Athletes (track and field) at the 1996 Summer Olympics
World Athletics Championships athletes for Russia
Russian Athletics Championships winners